Mant is a commune in the Landes department in Aquitaine in southwestern France.

Mant may also refer to:
 Mant!, a film within the 1993 film Matinee
 Mant Tehsil, in Mathura district of Uttar Pradesh, India
 Mant (Assembly constituency), in Mathura district of Uttar Pradesh, India

People
 Alicia Catherine Mant (1788–1869), English writer of children's stories
 Gilbert Mant (1902–1997), Australian journalist and author
 John Mant OBE (1897–1985), Australian solicitor
 Keith Mant (1919–2000), British  forensic pathologist
 Richard Mant (1776–1848), English churchman and writer
 Robert Mant (1786–1834), Anglican priest in Ireland
 Walter Mant (1808–1869), Anglican priest in Ireland, son of Richard